Metaphysics is the branch of philosophy that studies the fundamental nature of reality; the first principles of being, identity and change, space and time, cause and effect, necessity and possibility. 

Metaphysics is considered one of the four main branches of philosophy, along with epistemology, logic, and ethics.
It includes questions about the nature of consciousness and the relationship between mind and matter, between substance and attribute, and between potentiality and actuality.

Metaphysics studies questions related to what it is for something to exist and what types of existence are there. Metaphysics seeks to answer, in an abstract and fully general manner, the questions of: What is  that exists; and What  is like.

Etymology
The word "metaphysics" derives from the Greek words μετά (metá, "after") and φυσικά (physiká, "physics"). It has been suggested that the term might have been coined by a first century CE editor who assembled various small selections of Aristotle's works into the treatise we now know by the name Metaphysics (μετὰ τὰ φυσικά, meta ta physika,  'after the Physics ' – another of Aristotle's works). The prefix meta- ("after") indicates that these works come "after" the chapters on physics. Aristotle himself did not call the subject of his books "metaphysics"; he referred to it as "first philosophy". The editor of Aristotle's works, Andronicus of Rhodes, is thought to have placed the books on first philosophy right after another work, Physics, and called them  (tà metà tà physikà biblía) or "the books [that come] after the [books on] physics".

However, once the name was given, the commentators sought to find other reasons for its appropriateness. For instance, Thomas Aquinas understood it to refer to the chronological or pedagogical order among our philosophical studies, so that the "metaphysical sciences" would mean "those that we study after having mastered the sciences that deal with the physical world".

The term was misread by other medieval commentators, who thought it meant "the science of what is beyond the physical". Following this tradition, the prefix meta- has more recently been prefixed to the names of sciences to designate higher sciences dealing with ulterior and more fundamental problems: hence metamathematics, metaphysiology, etc.

A person who creates or develops metaphysical theories is called a metaphysician.

Common parlance also uses the word metaphysics for a different referent from that of those already mentioned, namely for beliefs in arbitrary non-physical or magical entities. For example, "metaphysical healing" to refer to healing by means of remedies that are magical rather than scientific. This usage stemmed from the various historical schools of speculative metaphysics which operated by postulating all manner of physical, mental and spiritual entities as bases for particular metaphysical systems. Metaphysics as a subject does not preclude beliefs in such magical entities but neither does it promote them. Rather, it is the subject which provides the vocabulary and logic with which such beliefs might be analyzed and studied, for example to search for inconsistencies both within themselves and with other accepted systems such as science.

Epistemological foundation

Metaphysical study is conducted using deduction from that which is known a priori. Like foundational mathematics (which is sometimes considered a special case of metaphysics applied to the existence of number), it tries to give a coherent account of the structure of the world, capable of explaining our everyday and scientific perception of the world, and being free from contradictions. In mathematics, there are many different ways to define numbers; similarly, in metaphysics, there are many different ways to define objects, properties, and Goals, for it to be come concepts of its Nature, and other entities that are claimed to make up the world. While metaphysics may, as a special case, study the entities postulated by fundamental science such as atoms and superstrings, its core topic is the set of categories such as object, property and causality which those scientific theories assume. For example: claiming that "electrons have charge" is espousing a scientific theory; while exploring what it means for electrons to be (or at least, to be perceived as) "objects", charge to be a "property", and for both to exist in a topological entity called "space," is the task of metaphysics.

There are two broad stances about what is "the world" studied by metaphysics. According to metaphysical realism, the objects studied by metaphysics exist independently of any observer so that the subject is the most fundamental of all sciences. Metaphysical anti-realism, on the other hand, assumes that the objects studied by metaphysics exist inside the mind of an observer, so the subject becomes a form of introspection and conceptual analysis. This position is of more recent origin. Some philosophers, notably Kant, discuss both of these "worlds" and what can be inferred about each one. Some, such as the logical positivists, and many scientists, reject the metaphysical realism as meaningless and unverifiable. Others reply that this criticism also applies to any type of knowledge, including hard science, which claims to describe anything other than the contents of human perception, and thus that the world of perception is the objective world in some sense. Metaphysics itself usually assumes that some stance has been taken on these questions and that it may proceed independently of the choice—the question of which stance to take belongs instead to another branch of philosophy, epistemology.

Central questions

Ontology (being)

Ontology is the branch of philosophy that studies concepts such as existence, being, becoming, and reality. It includes the questions of how entities are grouped into basic categories and which of these entities exist on the most fundamental level. Ontology is sometimes referred to as the science of being. It has been characterized as general metaphysics in contrast to special metaphysics, which is concerned with more particular aspects of being. Ontologists often try to determine what the categories or highest kinds are and how they form a system of categories that provides an encompassing classification of all entities. Commonly proposed categories include substances, properties, relations, states of affairs and events. These categories are characterized by fundamental ontological concepts, like particularity and universality, abstractness and concreteness or possibility and necessity. Of special interest is the concept of ontological dependence, which determines whether the entities of a category exist on the most fundamental level. Disagreements within ontology are often about whether entities belonging to a certain category exist and, if so, how they are related to other entities.

Identity and change

Identity is a fundamental metaphysical concern. Metaphysicians investigating identity are tasked with the question of what, exactly, it means for something to be identical to itself, or – more controversially – to something else. Issues of identity arise in the context of time: what does it mean for something to be itself across two moments in time? How do we account for this? Another question of identity arises when we ask what our criteria ought to be for determining identity, and how the reality of identity interfaces with linguistic expressions.

The metaphysical positions one takes on identity have far-reaching implications on issues such as the mind–body problem, personal identity, ethics, and law.

A few ancient Greeks took extreme positions on the nature of change. Parmenides denied change altogether, while Heraclitus argued that change was ubiquitous: "No man ever steps in the same river twice."

Identity, sometimes called numerical identity, is the relation that a thing bears to itself, and which no thing bears to anything other than itself (cf. sameness).

A modern philosopher who made a lasting impact on the philosophy of identity was Leibniz, whose law of the indiscernibility of identicals is still widely accepted today. It states that if some object x is identical to some object y, then any property that x has, y will have as well.

Put formally, it states

However, it does seem that objects can change over time. Two rival theories to account for the relationship between change and identity are perdurantism, which treats objects as a series of object-stages, and endurantism, which maintains that the organism—the same object—is present at every stage in its history.

By appealing to intrinsic and extrinsic properties, endurantism finds a way to harmonize identity with change. Endurantists believe that objects persist by being strictly numerically identical over time. However, if Leibniz's law of the indiscernibility of identicals is used to define numerical identity here, it seems that objects must be completely unchanged in order to persist. Discriminating between intrinsic properties and extrinsic properties, endurantists state that numerical identity means that, if some object x is identical to some object y, then any intrinsic property that x has, y will have as well. Thus, if an object persists, intrinsic properties of it are unchanged, but extrinsic properties can change over time. Besides the object itself, environments and other objects can change over time; properties that relate to other objects would change even if this object does not change.

Perdurantism can harmonize identity with change in another way. In four-dimensionalism, a version of perdurantism, what persists is a four-dimensional object which does not change although three-dimensional slices of the object may differ.

Space and time

Objects appear to us in space and time, while abstract entities such as classes, properties, and relations do not. How do space and time serve this function as a ground for objects? Are space and time entities themselves, of some form? Must they exist prior to objects? How exactly can they be defined? How is time related to change; must there always be something changing in order for time to exist?

Causality

Classical philosophy recognized a number of causes, including teleological final causes. In special relativity and quantum field theory the notions of space, time and causality become tangled together, with temporal orders of causations becoming dependent on who is observing them. The laws of physics are symmetrical in time, so could equally well be used to describe time as running backwards. Why then do we perceive it as flowing in one direction, the arrow of time, and as containing causation flowing in the same direction?

For that matter, can an effect precede its cause? This was the title of a 1954 paper by Michael Dummett, which sparked a discussion that continues today. Earlier, in 1947, C. S. Lewis had argued that one can meaningfully pray concerning the outcome of, e.g., a medical test while recognizing that the outcome is determined by past events: "My free act contributes to the cosmic shape." Likewise, some interpretations of quantum mechanics, dating to 1945, involve backward-in-time causal influences.

Causality is linked by many philosophers to the concept of counterfactuals. To say that A caused B means that if A had not happened then B would not have happened. This view was advanced by David Lewis in his 1973 paper "Causation". His subsequent papers further develop his theory of causation.

Causality is usually required as a foundation for philosophy of science if science aims to understand causes and effects and make predictions about them.

Necessity and possibility

Metaphysicians investigate questions about the ways the world could have been. David Lewis, in On the Plurality of Worlds, endorsed a view called concrete modal realism, according to which facts about how things could have been are made true by other concrete worlds in which things are different. Other philosophers, including Gottfried Leibniz, have dealt with the idea of possible worlds as well. A necessary fact is true across all possible worlds. A possible fact is true in some possible world, even if not in the actual world. For example, it is possible that cats could have had two tails, or that any particular apple could have not existed. By contrast, certain propositions seem necessarily true, such as analytic propositions, e.g., "All bachelors are unmarried." The view that any analytic truth is necessary is not universally held among philosophers. A less controversial view is that self-identity is necessary, as it seems fundamentally incoherent to claim that any x is not identical to itself; this is known as the law of identity, a putative "first principle". Similarly, Aristotle describes the principle of non-contradiction:
It is impossible that the same quality should both belong and not belong to the same thing ... This is the most certain of all principles ... Wherefore they who demonstrate refer to this as an ultimate opinion. For it is by nature the source of all the other axioms.

Peripheral questions

Metaphysical cosmology and cosmogony

Metaphysical cosmology is the branch of metaphysics that deals with the world as the totality of all phenomena in space and time. Historically, it formed a major part of the subject alongside ontology, though its role is more peripheral in contemporary philosophy. It has had a broad scope, and in many cases was founded in religion. The ancient Greeks drew no distinction between this use and their model for the cosmos. However, in modern times it addresses questions about the Universe which are beyond the scope of the physical sciences. It is distinguished from religious cosmology in that it approaches these questions using philosophical methods (e.g. dialectics).

Cosmogony deals specifically with the origin of the universe. Modern metaphysical cosmology and cosmogony try to address questions such as:
 What is the origin of the Universe? What is its first cause? Is its existence necessary? (see monism, pantheism, emanationism and creationism)
 What are the ultimate material components of the Universe? (see mechanism, dynamism, hylomorphism, atomism)
 What is the ultimate reason for the existence of the Universe? Does the cosmos have a purpose? (see teleology)

Mind and matter

Accounting for the existence of mind in a world largely composed of matter is a metaphysical problem which is so large and important as to have become a specialized subject of study in its own right, philosophy of mind.

Substance dualism is a classical theory in which mind and body are essentially different, with the mind having some of the attributes traditionally assigned to the soul, and which creates an immediate conceptual puzzle about how the two interact. This form of substance dualism differs from the dualism of some eastern philosophical traditions (like Nyāya), which also posit a soul; for the soul, under their view, is ontologically distinct from the mind. Idealism postulates that material objects do not exist unless perceived and only as perceptions. Adherents of panpsychism, a kind of property dualism, hold that everything has a mental aspect, but not that everything exists in a mind. Neutral monism postulates that existence consists of a single substance that in itself is neither mental nor physical, but is capable of mental and physical aspects or attributesthus it implies a dual-aspect theory. For the last century, the dominant theories have been science-inspired including materialistic monism, type identity theory, token identity theory, functionalism, reductive physicalism, nonreductive physicalism, eliminative materialism, anomalous monism, property dualism, epiphenomenalism and emergentism.

Determinism and free will

Determinism is the philosophical proposition that every event, including human cognition, decision and action, is causally determined by an unbroken chain of prior occurrences. It holds that nothing happens that has not already been determined. The principal consequence of the deterministic claim is that it poses a challenge to the existence of free will.

The problem of free will is the problem of whether rational agents exercise control over their own actions and decisions. Addressing this problem requires understanding the relation between freedom and causation, and determining whether the laws of nature are causally deterministic. Some philosophers, known as incompatibilists, view determinism and free will as mutually exclusive. If they believe in determinism, they will therefore believe free will to be an illusion, a position known as hard determinism. Proponents range from Baruch Spinoza to Ted Honderich. Henri Bergson defended free will in his dissertation Time and Free Will from 1889.

Others, labeled compatibilists (or "soft determinists"), believe that the two ideas can be reconciled coherently. Adherents of this view include Thomas Hobbes and many modern philosophers such as John Martin Fischer, Gary Watson, Harry Frankfurt, and the like.

Incompatibilists who accept free will but reject determinism are called libertarians, a term not to be confused with the political sense. Robert Kane and Alvin Plantinga are modern defenders of this theory.

Natural and social kinds
The earliest type of classification of social construction traces back to Plato in his dialogue Phaedrus where he claims that the biological classification system seems to carve nature at the joints. In contrast, later philosophers such as Michel Foucault and Jorge Luis Borges have challenged the capacity of natural and social classification. In his essay The Analytical Language of John Wilkins, Borges makes us imagine a certain encyclopedia where the animals are divided into (a) those that belong to the emperor; (b) embalmed ones; (c) those that are trained; ... and so forth, in order to bring forward the ambiguity of natural and social kinds. According to metaphysics author Alyssa Ney: "The reason all this is interesting is that there seems to be a metaphysical difference between the Borgesian system and Plato's". The difference is not obvious but one classification attempts to carve entities up according to objective distinction while the other does not. According to Quine this notion is closely related to the notion of similarity. The philosopher of social science Jason Josephson Storm has attempted to provide a more precise definition of social kinds, arguing that social kinds may still be real insofar as they are determined by empricially observable causal processes and that many cases of what appear to be natural kinds — including biological natural kinds and the category of "natural kind" itself — are in fact social kinds; such a view would mitigate the need to prioritize natural kinds above social kinds for much scientific practice.

Number

There are different ways to set up the notion of number in metaphysics theories. Platonist theories postulate number as a fundamental category itself. Others consider it to be a property of an entity called a "group" comprising other entities; or to be a relation held between several groups of entities, such as "the number four is the set of all sets of four things". Many of the debates around universals are applied to the study of number, and are of particular importance due to its status as a foundation for the philosophy of mathematics and for mathematics itself.

Applied metaphysics
Although metaphysics as a philosophical enterprise is highly hypothetical, it also has practical application in most other branches of philosophy, science, and now also information technology. Such areas generally assume some basic ontology (such as a system of objects, properties, classes, and space-time) as well as other metaphysical stances on topics such as causality and agency, then build their own particular theories upon these.

In science, for example, some theories are based on the ontological assumption of objects with properties (such as electrons having charge) while others may reject objects completely (such as quantum field theories, where spread-out "electronness" becomes property of space-time rather than an object).

"Social" branches of philosophy such as philosophy of morality, aesthetics and philosophy of religion (which in turn give rise to practical subjects such as ethics, politics, law, and art) all require metaphysical foundations, which may be considered as branches or applications of metaphysics. For example, they may postulate the existence of basic entities such as value, beauty, and God. Then they use these postulates to make their own arguments about consequences resulting from them. When philosophers in these subjects make their foundations they are doing applied metaphysics, and may draw upon its core topics and methods to guide them, including ontology and other core and peripheral topics. As in science, the foundations chosen will in turn depend on the underlying ontology used, so philosophers in these subjects may have to dig right down to the ontological layer of metaphysics to find what is possible for their theories.

Systems engineering is essentially based on metaphysics, although without acknowledging it. This is because systems-engineering is primarily concerned with identifying what would be of interest in a prospective new system. Investigating the nature of the situation aka ontology and surveying the possibilities in measuring, evaluating, specifying, planning, implementing, integrating, testing and using it aka epistemology.

Relation to other disciplines

Science
Prior to the modern history of science, scientific questions were addressed as a part of natural philosophy. Originally, the term "science" simply meant "knowledge". The scientific method, however, transformed natural philosophy into an empirical activity deriving from experiment, unlike the rest of philosophy. By the end of the 18th century, it had begun to be called "science" to distinguish it from other branches of philosophy. Science and philosophy have been considered separated disciplines ever since. Thereafter, metaphysics denoted philosophical enquiry of a non-empirical character into the nature of existence.

Metaphysics continues asking "why" where science leaves off. For example, any theory of fundamental physics is based on some set of axioms, which may postulate the existence of entities such as atoms, particles, forces, charges, mass, or fields. Stating such postulates is considered to be the "end" of a science theory. Metaphysics takes these postulates and explores what they mean as human concepts. For example, do all theories of physics require the existence of space and time, objects, and properties? Or can they be expressed using only objects, or only properties? Do the objects have to retain their identity over time or can they change? If they change, then are they still the same object? Can theories be reformulated by converting properties or predicates (such as "red") into entities (such as redness or redness fields) or processes ('there is some redding happening over there' appears in some human languages in place of the use of properties). Is the distinction between objects and properties fundamental to the physical world or to our perception of it?

Much recent work has been devoted to analyzing the role of metaphysics in scientific theorizing. Alexandre Koyré led this movement, declaring in his book Metaphysics and Measurement, "It is not by following experiment, but by outstripping experiment, that the scientific mind makes progress." That metaphysical propositions can influence scientific theorizing is John Watkins' most lasting contribution to philosophy. Since 1957 "he showed the ways in which some un-testable and hence, according to Popperian ideas, non-empirical propositions can nevertheless be influential in the development of properly testable and hence scientific theories. These profound results in applied elementary logic...represented an important corrective to positivist teachings about the meaninglessness of metaphysics and of normative claims". Imre Lakatos maintained that all scientific theories have a metaphysical "hard core" essential for the generation of hypotheses and theoretical assumptions. Thus, according to Lakatos, "scientific changes are connected with vast cataclysmic metaphysical revolutions."

An example from biology of Lakatos' thesis: David Hull has argued that changes in the ontological status of the species concept have been central in the development of biological thought from Aristotle through Cuvier, Lamarck, and Darwin. Darwin's ignorance of metaphysics made it more difficult for him to respond to his critics because he could not readily grasp the ways in which their underlying metaphysical views differed from his own.

In physics, new metaphysical ideas have arisen in connection with quantum mechanics, where subatomic particles arguably do not have the same sort of individuality as the particulars with which philosophy has traditionally been concerned. Also, adherence to a deterministic metaphysics in the face of the challenge posed by the quantum-mechanical uncertainty principle led physicists such as Albert Einstein to propose alternative theories that retained determinism. A.N. Whitehead is famous for creating a process philosophy metaphysics inspired by electromagnetism and special relativity.

In chemistry, Gilbert Newton Lewis addressed the nature of motion, arguing that an electron should not be said to move when it has none of the properties of motion.

Katherine Hawley notes that the metaphysics even of a widely accepted scientific theory may be challenged if it can be argued that the metaphysical presuppositions of the theory make no contribution to its predictive success.

Theology 
There is a relationship between theological doctrines and philosophical reflection in the philosophy of a religion (such as Christian philosophy); philosophical reflections are strictly rational. On this way of seeing the two disciplines, if at least one of the premises of an argument is derived from revelation, the argument falls in the domain of theology; otherwise it falls into philosophy's domain.

Rejections of metaphysics
Meta-metaphysics is the branch of philosophy that is concerned with the foundations of metaphysics. A number of individuals have suggested that much or all of metaphysics should be rejected, a meta-metaphysical position known as metaphysical deflationism or ontological deflationism.

In the 16th century, Francis Bacon rejected scholastic metaphysics, and argued strongly for what is now called empiricism, being seen later as the father of modern empirical science. In the 18th century, David Hume took a strong position, arguing that all genuine knowledge involves either mathematics or matters of fact and that metaphysics, which goes beyond these, is worthless. He concluded his Enquiry Concerning Human Understanding (1748) with the statement:

If we take in our hand any volume [book]; of divinity or school metaphysics, for instance; let us ask, Does it contain any abstract reasoning concerning quantity or number? No. Does it contain any experimental reasoning concerning matter of fact and existence? No. Commit it then to the flames: for it can contain nothing but sophistry and illusion.

Thirty-three years after Hume's Enquiry appeared, Immanuel Kant published his Critique of Pure Reason. Although he followed Hume in rejecting much of previous metaphysics, he argued that there was still room for some synthetic a priori knowledge, concerned with matters of fact yet obtainable independent of experience. These included fundamental structures of space, time, and causality. He also argued for the freedom of the will and the existence of "things in themselves", the ultimate (but unknowable) objects of experience.

Wittgenstein introduced the concept that metaphysics could be influenced by theories of aesthetics, via logic, vis. a world composed of "atomical facts".

In the 1930s, A.J. Ayer and Rudolf Carnap endorsed Hume's position; Carnap quoted the passage above. They argued that metaphysical statements are neither true nor false but meaningless since, according to their verifiability theory of meaning, a statement is meaningful only if there can be empirical evidence for or against it. Thus, while Ayer rejected the monism of Spinoza, he avoided a commitment to pluralism, the contrary position, by holding both views to be without meaning. Carnap took a similar line with the controversy over the reality of the external world. While the logical positivism movement is now considered dead (with Ayer, a major proponent, admitting in a 1979 TV interview that "nearly all of it was false"), it has continued to influence philosophy development.

Arguing against such rejections, the Scholastic philosopher Edward Feser held that Hume's critique of metaphysics, and specifically Hume's fork, is "notoriously self-refuting". Feser argues that Hume's fork itself is not a conceptual truth and is not empirically testable.

Some living philosophers, such as Amie Thomasson, have argued that many metaphysical questions can be dissolved just by looking at the way words are used; others, such as Ted Sider, have argued that metaphysical questions are substantive, and that progress can be made toward answering them by comparing theories according to a range of theoretical virtues inspired by the sciences, such as simplicity and explanatory power.

History and schools of metaphysics

Pre-history
Cognitive archeology such as analysis of cave paintings and other pre-historic art and customs suggests that a form of perennial philosophy or Shamanic metaphysics may stretch back to the birth of behavioral modernity, all around the world. Similar beliefs are found in present-day "stone age" cultures such as Australian aboriginals. Perennial philosophy postulates the existence of a spirit or concept world alongside the day-to-day world, and interactions between these worlds during dreaming and ritual, or on special days or at special places. It has been argued that perennial philosophy formed the basis for Platonism, with Plato articulating, rather than creating, much older widespread beliefs.

Bronze Age
Bronze Age cultures such as ancient Mesopotamia and ancient Egypt (along with similarly structured but chronologically later cultures such as Mayans and Aztecs) developed belief systems based on mythology, anthropomorphic gods, mind–body dualism, and a spirit world, to explain causes and cosmology. These cultures appear to have been interested in astronomy and may have associated or identified the stars with some of these entities. In ancient Egypt, the ontological distinction between order (maat) and chaos (Isfet) seems to have been important.

Pre-Socratic Greece

The first named Greek philosopher, according to Aristotle, is Thales of Miletus, early 6th century BCE. He made use of purely physical explanations to explain the phenomena of the world rather than the mythological and divine explanations of tradition. He is thought to have posited water as the single underlying principle (or arche in later Aristotelian terminology) of the material world. His fellow, but younger Miletians, Anaximander and Anaximenes, also posited monistic underlying principles, namely apeiron (the indefinite or boundless) and air respectively.

Another school was the Eleatics, in southern Italy. The group was founded in the early fifth century BCE by Parmenides, and included Zeno of Elea and Melissus of Samos. Methodologically, the Eleatics were broadly rationalist, and took logical standards of clarity and necessity to be the criteria of truth. Parmenides' chief doctrine was that reality is a single unchanging and universal Being. Zeno used reductio ad absurdum, to demonstrate the illusory nature of change and time in his paradoxes.

Heraclitus of Ephesus, in contrast, made change central, teaching that "all things flow". His philosophy, expressed in brief aphorisms, is quite cryptic. For instance, he also taught the unity of opposites.

Democritus and his teacher Leucippus, are known for formulating an atomic theory for the cosmos. They are considered forerunners of the scientific method.

Classical China

Metaphysics in Chinese philosophy can be traced back to the earliest Chinese philosophical concepts from the Zhou dynasty such as Tian (Heaven) and yin and yang. The fourth century BCE saw a turn towards cosmogony with the rise of Taoism (in the Daodejing and Zhuangzi) and sees the natural world as dynamic and constantly changing processes which spontaneously arise from a single immanent metaphysical source or principle (Tao). Another philosophical school which arose around this time was the School of Naturalists which saw the ultimate metaphysical principle as the Taiji, the "supreme polarity" composed of the forces of yin and yang which were always in a state of change seeking balance. Another concern of Chinese metaphysics, especially Taoism, is the relationship and nature of being and non-being (you 有 and wu 無). The Taoists held that the ultimate, the Tao, was also non-being or no-presence. Other important concepts were those of spontaneous generation or natural vitality (Ziran) and "correlative resonance" (Ganying).

After the fall of the Han dynasty (220 CE), China saw the rise of the Neo-Taoist Xuanxue school. This school was very influential in developing the concepts of later Chinese metaphysics. Buddhist philosophy entered China (c. 1st century) and was influenced by the native Chinese metaphysical concepts to develop new theories. The native Tiantai and Huayen schools of philosophy maintained and reinterpreted the Indian theories of shunyata (emptiness, kong 空) and Buddha-nature (Fo xing 佛性) into the theory of interpenetration of phenomena. Neo-Confucians like Zhang Zai under the influence of other schools developed the concepts of "principle" (li) and vital energy (qi).

Classical Greece

Socrates and Plato

Plato is famous for his theory of forms (which he places in the mouth of Socrates in his dialogues). Platonic realism (also considered a form of idealism) is considered to be a solution to the problem of universals; i.e., what particular objects have in common is that they share a specific Form which is universal to all others of their respective kind.

The theory has a number of other aspects:
 Epistemological: knowledge of the Forms is more certain than mere sensory data.
 Ethical: The Form of the Good sets an objective standard for morality.
 Time and Change: The world of the Forms is eternal and unchanging. Time and change belong only to the lower sensory world. "Time is a moving image of Eternity".
 Abstract objects and mathematics: Numbers, geometrical figures, etc., exist mind-independently in the World of Forms.

Platonism developed into Neoplatonism, a philosophy with a monotheistic and mystical flavour that survived well into the early Christian era.

Aristotle
Plato's pupil Aristotle wrote widely on almost every subject, including metaphysics. His solution to the problem of universals contrasts with Plato's. Whereas Platonic Forms are existentially apparent in the visible world, Aristotelian essences dwell in particulars.

Potentiality and actuality are principles of a dichotomy which Aristotle used throughout his philosophical works to analyze motion, causality and other issues.

The Aristotelian theory of change and causality stretches to four causes: the material, formal, efficient and final. The efficient cause corresponds to what is now known as a cause simplicity. Final causes are explicitly teleological, a concept now regarded as controversial in science. The Matter/Form dichotomy was to become highly influential in later philosophy as the substance/essence distinction.

The opening arguments in Aristotle's Metaphysics, Book I, revolve around the senses, knowledge, experience, theory, and wisdom. The first main focus in the Metaphysics is attempting to determine how intellect "advances from sensation through memory, experience, and art, to theoretical knowledge". Aristotle claims that eyesight provides the capability to recognize and remember experiences, while sound allows learning.

Classical India
More on Indian philosophy: Hindu philosophy

Sāṃkhya
Sāṃkhya is an ancient system of Indian philosophy based on a dualism involving the ultimate principles of consciousness and matter. It is described as the rationalist school of Indian philosophy. It is most related to the Yoga school of Hinduism, and its method was most influential on the development of Early Buddhism.

The Sāmkhya is an enumerationist philosophy whose epistemology accepts three of six pramanas (proofs) as the only reliable means of gaining knowledge. These include pratyakṣa (perception), anumāṇa (inference) and śabda (āptavacana, word/testimony of reliable sources).

Samkhya is strongly dualist. Sāmkhya philosophy regards the universe as consisting of two realities; puruṣa (consciousness) and prakṛti (matter). Jiva (a living being) is that state in which puruṣa is bonded to prakṛti in some form. This fusion, state the Samkhya scholars, led to the emergence of buddhi ("spiritual awareness") and ahaṅkāra (ego consciousness). The universe is described by this school as one created by purusa-prakṛti entities infused with various permutations and combinations of variously enumerated elements, senses, feelings, activity and mind. During the state of imbalance, one of more constituents overwhelm the others, creating a form of bondage, particularly of the mind. The end of this imbalance, bondage is called liberation, or moksha, by the Samkhya school.

The existence of God or supreme being is not directly asserted, nor considered relevant by the Samkhya philosophers. Sāṃkhya denies the final cause of Ishvara (God). While the Samkhya school considers the Vedas as a reliable source of knowledge, it is an atheistic philosophy according to Paul Deussen and other scholars. A key difference between Samkhya and Yoga schools, state scholars, is that Yoga school accepts a "personal, yet essentially inactive, deity" or "personal god".

Samkhya is known for its theory of guṇas (qualities, innate tendencies). Guṇa, it states, are of three types: sattva being good, compassionate, illuminating, positive, and constructive; rajas is one of activity, chaotic, passion, impulsive, potentially good or bad; and tamas being the quality of darkness, ignorance, destructive, lethargic, negative. Everything, all life forms and human beings, state Samkhya scholars, have these three guṇas, but in different proportions. The interplay of these guṇas defines the character of someone or something, of nature and determines the progress of life. The Samkhya theory of guṇas was widely discussed, developed and refined by various schools of Indian philosophies, including Buddhism. Samkhya's philosophical treatises also influenced the development of various theories of Hindu ethics.

Vedānta
Realization of the nature of self-identity is the principal object of the Vedanta system of Indian metaphysics. In the Upanishads, self-consciousness is not the first-person indexical self-awareness or the self-awareness which is self-reference without identification, and also not the self-consciousness which as a kind of desire is satisfied by another self-consciousness. It is self-realisation; the realisation of the self consisting of consciousness that leads all else.

The word self-consciousness in the Upanishads means the knowledge about the existence and nature of manusya, human being. It means the consciousness of our own real being, the primary reality. Self-consciousness means self-knowledge, the knowledge of Prajna i.e. of Prana which is attained by a Brahman. According to the Upanishads the Atman or Paramatman is phenomenally unknowable; it is the object of realisation. The Atman is unknowable in its essential nature; it is unknowable in its essential nature because it is the eternal subject who knows about everything including itself. The Atman is the knower and also the known.

Metaphysicians regard the self either to be distinct from the absolute or entirely identical with the absolute. They have given form to three schools of thought – the dualistic school, the quasi-dualistic school and the monistic school, as the result of their varying mystical experiences. Prakrti and Atman, when treated as two separate and distinct aspects form the basis of the dualism of the Shvetashvatara Upanishad. Quasi-dualism is reflected in the Vaishnavite-monotheism of Ramanuja and the absolute monism, in the teachings of Adi Shankara.

Self-consciousness is the fourth state of consciousness or Turiya, the first three being Vaisvanara, Taijasa and Prajna. These are the four states of individual consciousness.

There are three distinct stages leading to self-realisation. The first stage is in mystically apprehending the glory of the self within one as though one were distinct from it. The second stage is in identifying the "I-within" with the self, that one is in essential nature entirely identical with the pure self. The third stage is in realising that the Atman is Brahman, that there is no difference between the self and the absolute. The fourth stage is in realising "I am the Absolute" – Aham Brahman Asmi. The fifth stage is in realising that Brahman is the "all" that exists, as also that which does not exist.

Buddhist metaphysics
In Buddhist philosophy there are various metaphysical traditions that have proposed different questions about the nature of reality based on the teachings of the Buddha in the early Buddhist texts. The Buddha of the early texts does not focus on metaphysical questions but on ethical and spiritual training and in some cases, he dismisses certain metaphysical questions as unhelpful and indeterminate Avyakta, which he recommends should be set aside. The development of systematic metaphysics arose after the Buddha's death with the rise of the Abhidharma traditions. The Buddhist Abhidharma schools developed their analysis of reality based on the concept of dharmas which are the ultimate physical and mental events that makeup experience and their relations to each other. Noa Ronkin has called their approach "phenomenological".

Later philosophical traditions include the Madhyamika school of Nagarjuna, which further developed the theory of the emptiness (shunyata) of all phenomena or dharmas which rejects any kind of substance. This has been interpreted as a form of anti-foundationalism and anti-realism which sees reality as having no ultimate essence or ground. The Yogacara school meanwhile promoted a theory called "awareness only" (vijnapti-matra) which has been interpreted as a form of Idealism or Phenomenology and denies the split between awareness itself and the objects of awareness.

Islamic metaphysics

Major ideas in Islamic metaphysics have surrounded the concept of weḥdah (وحدة) meaning 'unity', or in Arabic توحيد tawhid. Waḥdat al-wujūd literally means the 'unity of existence' or 'unity of being'. In modern times the phrase has been translated as "pantheism." Wujud (i.e. existence or presence) here refers to Allah's wujud (compare tawhid). However, waḥdat ash-shuhūd, meaning 'apparentism' or 'monotheism of witness', holds that god and his creation are entirely separate.

Scholasticism and the Middle Ages

Between about 1100 and 1500, philosophy as a discipline took place as part of the Catholic church's teaching system, known as scholasticism. Scholastic philosophy took place within an established framework blending Christian theology with Aristotelian teachings. Although fundamental orthodoxies were not commonly challenged, there were nonetheless deep metaphysical disagreements, particularly over the problem of universals, which engaged Duns Scotus and Pierre Abelard. William of Ockham is remembered for his principle of ontological parsimony.

Continental rationalism

In the early modern period (17th and 18th centuries), the system-building scope of philosophy is often linked to the rationalist method of philosophy, that is the technique of deducing the nature of the world by pure reason. The scholastic concepts of substance and accident were employed.
 Leibniz proposed in his Monadology a plurality of non-interacting substances.
 Descartes is famous for his dualism of material and mental substances.
 Spinoza believed reality was a single substance of God-or-nature.

Christian Wolff had theoretical philosophy divided into an ontology or philosophia prima as a general metaphysics, which arises as a preliminary to the distinction of the three "special metaphysics" on the soul, world and God: rational psychology, rational cosmology and rational theology. The three disciplines are called empirical and rational because they are independent of revelation. This scheme, which is the counterpart of religious tripartition in creature, creation, and Creator, is best known to philosophical students by Kant's treatment of it in the Critique of Pure Reason. In the "Preface" of the 2nd edition of Kant's book, Wolff is defined "the greatest of all dogmatic philosophers."

British empiricism

British empiricism marked something of a reaction to rationalist and system-building metaphysics, or speculative metaphysics as it was pejoratively termed. The skeptic David Hume famously declared that most metaphysics should be consigned to the flames (see below). Hume was notorious among his contemporaries as one of the first philosophers to openly doubt religion, but is better known now for his critique of causality. John Stuart Mill, Thomas Reid and John Locke were less skeptical, embracing a more cautious style of metaphysics based on realism, common sense and science. Other philosophers, notably George Berkeley were led from empiricism to idealistic metaphysics.

Kant
Immanuel Kant attempted a grand synthesis and revision of the trends already mentioned: scholastic philosophy, systematic metaphysics, and skeptical empiricism, not to forget the burgeoning science of his day. As did the systems builders, he had an overarching framework in which all questions were to be addressed. Like Hume, who famously woke him from his 'dogmatic slumbers', he was suspicious of metaphysical speculation, and also places much emphasis on the limitations of the human mind.
Kant described his shift in metaphysics away from making claims about an objective noumenal world, towards exploring the subjective phenomenal world, as a Copernican Revolution, by analogy to (though opposite in direction to) Copernicus' shift from man (the subject) to the sun (an object) at the center of the universe.

Kant saw rationalist philosophers as aiming for a kind of metaphysical knowledge he defined as the synthetic apriori—that is knowledge that does not come from the senses (it is a priori) but is nonetheless about reality (synthetic). Inasmuch as it is about reality, it differs from abstract mathematical propositions (which he terms synthetic apriori), and being apriori it is distinct from empirical, scientific knowledge (which he terms synthetic aposteriori). The only synthetic apriori knowledge we can have is of how our minds organise the data of the senses; that organising framework is space and time, which for Kant have no mind-independent existence, but nonetheless operate uniformly in all humans. Apriori knowledge of space and time is all that remains of metaphysics as traditionally conceived. There is a reality beyond sensory data or phenomena, which he calls the realm of noumena; however, we cannot know it as it is in itself, but only as it appears to us. He allows himself to speculate that the origins of phenomenal God, morality, and free will might exist in the noumenal realm, but these possibilities have to be set against its basic unknowability for humans. Although he saw himself as having disposed of metaphysics, in a sense, he has generally been regarded in retrospect as having a metaphysics of his own, and as beginning the modern analytical conception of the subject.

Late modern philosophy

Nineteenth century philosophy was overwhelmingly influenced by Kant and his successors. Schopenhauer, Schelling, Fichte and Hegel all purveyed their own panoramic versions of German Idealism, Kant's own caution about metaphysical speculation, and refutation of idealism, having fallen by the wayside. The idealistic impulse continued into the early twentieth century with British idealists such as F. H. Bradley and J. M. E. McTaggart. Followers of Karl Marx took Hegel's dialectic view of history and re-fashioned it as materialism.

Early analytic philosophy and positivism
During the period when idealism was dominant in philosophy, science had been making great advances. The arrival of a new generation of scientifically minded philosophers led to a sharp decline in the popularity of idealism during the 1920s.

Analytic philosophy was spearheaded by Bertrand Russell and G. E. Moore. Russell and William James tried to compromise between idealism and materialism with the theory of neutral monism.

The early to mid-twentieth-century philosophy saw a trend to reject metaphysical questions as meaningless. The driving force behind this tendency was the philosophy of logical positivism as espoused by the Vienna Circle, which argued that the meaning of a statement was its prediction of observable results of an experiment, and thus that there is no need to postulate the existence of any objects other than these perceptual observations.

At around the same time, the American pragmatists were steering a middle course between materialism and idealism.
System-building metaphysics, with a fresh inspiration from science, was revived by A. N. Whitehead and Charles Hartshorne.

Continental philosophy
The forces that shaped analytic philosophy—the break with idealism, and the influence of science—were much less significant outside the English speaking world, although there was a shared turn toward language. Continental philosophy continued in a trajectory from post Kantianism.

The phenomenology of Husserl and others was intended as a collaborative project for the investigation of the features and structure of consciousness common to all humans, in line with Kant's basing his synthetic apriori on the uniform operation of consciousness. It was officially neutral with regards to ontology, but was nonetheless to spawn a number of metaphysical systems. Brentano's concept of intentionality would become widely influential, including on analytic philosophy.

Heidegger, author of Being and Time, saw himself as re-focusing on Being-qua-being, introducing the novel concept of Dasein in the process. Classing himself an existentialist, Sartre wrote an extensive study of Being and Nothingness.

The speculative realism movement marks a return to full blooded realism.

Process metaphysics

There are two fundamental aspects of everyday experience: change and persistence. Until recently, the Western philosophical tradition has arguably championed substance and persistence, with some notable exceptions, however. According to process thinkers, novelty, flux and accident do matter, and sometimes they constitute the ultimate reality.

In a broad sense, process metaphysics is as old as Western philosophy, with figures such as Heraclitus, Plotinus, Duns Scotus, Leibniz, David Hume, Georg Wilhelm Friedrich Hegel, Friedrich Wilhelm Joseph von Schelling, Gustav Theodor Fechner, Friedrich Adolf Trendelenburg, Charles Renouvier, Karl Marx, Ernst Mach, Friedrich Wilhelm Nietzsche, Émile Boutroux, Henri Bergson, Samuel Alexander and Nicolas Berdyaev. It seemingly remains an open question whether major "Continental" figures such as the late Martin Heidegger, Maurice Merleau-Ponty, Gilles Deleuze, Michel Foucault, or Jacques Derrida should be included.

In a strict sense, process metaphysics may be limited to the works of a few philosophers: G. W. F. Hegel, Charles Sanders Peirce, William James, Henri Bergson, A. N. Whitehead, and John Dewey. From a European perspective, there was a very significant and early Whiteheadian influence on the works of outstanding scholars such as Émile Meyerson (1859–1933), Louis Couturat (1868–1914), Jean Wahl (1888–1974), Robin George Collingwood (1889–1943), Philippe Devaux (1902–1979), Hans Jonas (1903–1993), Dorothy M. Emmett (1904–2000), Maurice Merleau Ponty (1908–1961), Enzo Paci (1911–1976), Charlie Dunbar Broad (1887–1971), Wolfe Mays (1912–2005), Ilya Prigogine (1917–2003), Jules Vuillemin (1920–2001), Jean Ladrière (1921–2007), Gilles Deleuze (1925–1995), Wolfhart Pannenberg (1928–2014), Reiner Wiehl (1929–2010), and Alain Badiou (1937-).

Contemporary analytic philosophy
While early analytic philosophy tended to reject metaphysical theorizing, under the influence of logical positivism, it was revived in the second half of the twentieth century. Philosophers such as David K. Lewis and David Armstrong developed elaborate theories on a range of topics such as universals, causation, possibility and necessity and abstract objects. However, the focus of analytic philosophy generally is away from the construction of all-encompassing systems and toward close analysis of individual ideas.

Among the developments that led to the revival of metaphysical theorizing were Quine's attack on the analytic–synthetic distinction, which was generally taken to undermine Carnap's distinction between existence questions internal to a framework and those external to it.

The philosophy of fiction, the problem of empty names, and the debate over existence's status as a property have all come of relative obscurity into the limelight, while perennial issues such as free will, possible worlds, and the philosophy of time have had new life breathed into them.

The analytic view is of metaphysics as studying phenomenal human concepts rather than making claims about the noumenal world, so its style often blurs into philosophy of language and introspective psychology. Compared to system-building, it can seem very dry, stylistically similar to computer programming, mathematics or even accountancy (as a common stated goal is to "account for" entities in the world).

See also
 Computational metaphysics
 Doctor of Metaphysics
 Feminist metaphysics
 Fundamental question of metaphysics
 Metacognition
 Metaphilosophy
 Meta-epistemology
 Meta-ethics
 Meta-ontology
 Metasemantics
 Metaphysical fiction novels
 Metaphysical grounding
 Philosophical logic
 Philosophical realism
 Philosophy of science
 Philosophical theology

Notes

References

Bibliography
 
 Butchvarov, Panayot (1979). Being Qua Being: A Theory of Identity, Existence and Predication. Bloomington and London: Indiana University Press.
 Chalmers, David, David Manley and Ryan Wasserman, eds. (2009). Metametaphysics: New Essays on the Foundations of Ontology. Oxford University Press.
 Crane, T and Farkas, K (2004). Metaphysics: A Guide and Anthology, Oxford University Press, .
 Gale, Richard M. (2002). The Blackwell Guide to Metaphysics. Oxford: Blackwell.
 Gay, Peter. (1966). The Enlightenment: An Interpretation (2 vols.). New York: W.W. Norton & Company.
 Harris, E. E. (1965). The Foundations of Metaphysics in Science. London: George Allen and Unwin.
 Harris, E. E. (2000). The Restitution of Metaphysics. New York: Humanity Books.
 Heisenberg, Werner (1958), "Atomic Physics and Causal Law," from The Physicist's Conception of Nature.
 Koons, Robert C. and Pickavance, Timothy H. (2015), Metaphysics: The Fundamentals. Wiley-Blackwell.
 Le Poidevin R. & al. eds. (2009). The Routledge Companion to Metaphysics. New York: Routledge.
 Loux, M. J. (2006). Metaphysics: A Contemporary Introduction (3rd ed.). London: Routledge.
 Lowe, E. J. (2002). A Survey of Metaphysics. Oxford: Oxford University Press.
 Tuomas E. Tahko (2015). An Introduction to Metametaphysics. Cambridge: Cambridge University Press.

Further reading
 Benovsky, Jiri (2016), Meta-metaphysics: On Metaphysical Equivalence, Primitiveness, and Theory Choice. Springer.
 Bliss, Ricki and J. T. M. Miller, eds. (forthcoming). The Routledge Handbook of Metametaphysics. Routledge.
 Kim, Jaegwon and Ernest Sosa, eds. (1999). Metaphysics: An Anthology. Blackwell Philosophy Anthologies.
 Kim, Jaegwon and Ernest Sosa, eds. (2000). A Companion to Metaphysics. Malden Massachusetts. Blackwell.
 Neil A. Manson, Robert W. Barnard, eds. (2014). The Bloomsbury Companion to Metaphysics. Bloomsbury.
 Raven, Michael J. (2020). The Routledge Handbook of Metaphysical Grounding. Routledge.

External links

 
 
 
 Metaphysics at Encyclopædia Britannica
 The London Philosophy Study Guide  offers many suggestions on what to read, depending on the student's familiarity with the subject: Logic & Metaphysics .